Anopyrops is a monotypic moth genus in the family Epipyropidae. Anopyrops corticina, its sole species, was described by Karl Jordan in 1928 and is found in French Guiana and Suriname.

References

Epipyropidae
Zygaenoidea genera
Monotypic moth genera
Moths of South America